Rhinoptera is a genus of ray commonly known as the cownose rays. This genus is the only member of the family Rhinopteridae.

Species
There are currently 8 recognized extant (living) species in this genus:

 Rhinoptera adspersa J. P. Müller & Henle, 1841  (Rough cownose ray)
 Rhinoptera bonasus (Mitchill, 1815)  (Cownose ray)
 Rhinoptera brasiliensis J. P. Müller, 1836 (Brazilian cownose ray)
 Rhinoptera javanica J. P. Müller & Henle, 1841 (Flapnose ray)
 Rhinoptera jayakari Boulenger, 1895 (Oman cownose ray)
 Rhinoptera marginata (É. Geoffroy Saint-Hilaire, 1817) (Lusitanian cownose ray)
 Rhinoptera neglecta J. D. Ogilby, 1912 (Australian cownose ray)
 Rhinoptera steindachneri Evermann & O. P. Jenkins, 1891 (Pacific cownose ray)

There are several other extinct species that only are known from fossil remains:

 †Rhinoptera prisca Woodward, 1907
 †Rhinoptera rasilis Böhm, 1926
 †Rhinoptera raeburni White, 1934
 †Rhinoptera schultzi Hiden, 1995
 †Rhinoptera sherborni White, 1926
 †Rhinoptera smithii Jordan & Beal, 1913
 †Rhinoptera studeri Agassiz, 1843
 †Rhinoptera woodwardi Agassiz, 1843

See also
 List of prehistoric cartilaginous fish

References

 
Ray genera
Taxa named by Johan Conrad van Hasselt
Taxonomy articles created by Polbot